2008 Bintang Popular Berita Harian Awards (2008 Most Popular Artiste Berita Harian Awards) were held on April 12, 2009 on Arena of Stars, Genting Highlands as an appreciation for artist and most entertained artist in 2008. The show was broadcast live by TV3. The winner of Most Popular Artist, Nabil defeated Mawi that had won three times in row in previous awards.

Performers
 Datuk Siti Nurhaliza — "Di Taman Teman"
 Faizal Tahir — "Bencinta"
 Farah Asyikin — "Helo"
 Ayu — "Hanya Di Mercu"

Presenters

 Mawi
 Ekin
 Que Haidar
 Linda Jasmine
 Lis Dawati
 Fauzi Nawawi
 Farid Kamil
 Lisa Surihani
 Maya Karin
 Nora Danish

 Norish Karman
 Rozita Che Wan
 Ayu Raudhah
 Umie Aida
 Zizie Ezette
 Eizlan Yusof
 Amy Mastura
 Fizo
 AG (Hot FM)
 Kieran (Hot FM)

Nominees and Winners

Most Popular Artist
 Nabil
 Datuk Siti Nurhaliza
 Mawi
 Aznil Nawawi
 Meet Uncle Hussain

Most Popular Male TV Host
 AC Mizal
 Ally Iskandar
 Aznil Nawawi
 Faizal Ismail
 Faizal Tahir

Most Popular Female TV Host
 Abby Fana
 Cheryl Samad
 Fara Fauzana
 Juliana Evans
 Nurul Alis

Most Popular Male Radio Presenter
 AG (Hot FM)
 Aznil Nawawi (Era)
 Faizal Ismail (Hot FM)
 Kieran (Hot FM)
 Khairil Rashid (Sinar FM)

Most Popular Female Radio Presenter
 Abby Fana (Sinar FM)
 Fara Fauzana (Hot FM)
 Leeya (Hot FM)
 Linda Onn (Sinar FM)
 Nana (Era)

Most Popular Male Comedy Artist
 AC Mizal
 Afdlin Shauki
 Nabil Raja Lawak
 Saiful Apek
 Zizan

Most Popular Female Comedy Artist
 Amyza Aznan
 Kenchana Devi
 Noorkhiriah
 Ruminah Sidek
 Sheila Mambo

Most Popular Male New Artist
 Aiman
 Fizo Omar
 Nabil Raja Lawak
 Nubhan
 Riz

Most Popular Female New Artist
 Ayu Damit
 Lisa Surihani
 Sari Yanti
 Scha
 Stacy

Most Popular Nasyid Artist
 Aiman
 Akhil Hayy
 Hijjaz
 Rabbani
 Raihan

Most Popular Group/Duo
 Estranged
 Fabulous Cats
 Hujan
 M. Nasir & Malique
 Meet Uncle Hussain

Most Popular Male Singer
 Adam
 Aizat
 Amy Search
 Mawi
 Nubhan

Most Popular Female Singer
 Elyana
 Jaclyn Victor
 Mila
 Datuk Siti Nurhaliza
 Stacy

Most Popular Film Actor
 Farid Kamil
 Que Haidar
 Rosyam Nor
 Rusdi Ramli
 Saiful Apek

Most Popular Film Actress
 Erra Fazira
 Liyana Jasmay
 Maya Karin
 Sharifah Amani
 Vanidah Imran

Most Popular TV Actor
 Aaron Aziz
 Aqasha
 Ashraf Muslim
 Fahrin Ahmad
 Rosyam Nor

Most Popular TV Actress
 Abby Abadi
 Diana Danielle
 Dynas
 Fasha Sandha
 Rita Rudaini

Lifetime Achievement Award
 Jamal Abdillah

Malaysian music awards